The Mivchar Hepeninim is an ethical work, dated 1484, written by Rabbi Shlomo ben Yehudah in Spain.

External links

Jewish philosophical and ethical texts
1484 books